Ang Mong Seng  (born 30 September 1949) is a Malaysia-born Singaporean former politician. He was a Member of Parliament for the Bukit Gombak ward under Hong Kah Group Representation Constituency (Hong Kah GRC) from 2001 to 2011.

Ang graduated from the former Nanyang University and worked at the Housing and Development Board during the 1970s. By 1988 he had worked his way up the ranks to become General Manager of Bukit Panjang and later Sembawang Town Councils.

In the 2006 general elections, Ang's party, the People's Action Party (PAP), had a walkover as Hong Kah GRC was not contested. In the 2001 general elections, the PAP defeated the Singapore Democratic Party with 79.74% of the votes for Hong Kah GRC.

Prior to his stint in Hong Kah GRC, Ang represented Bukit Gombak SMC from 1997 to 2001 where he defeated Ling How Doong from Singapore Democratic Party and a third candidate from the Singapore People's Party in the 1997 general elections. Until 2011, he has sat on four select committees in Parliament.

Ang retired from politics prior to the 2011 general elections, and Bukit Gombak ward was absorbed into the newly created Chua Chu Kang GRC while Hong Kah GRC was dissolved.

References

1949 births
Members of the Parliament of Singapore
People's Action Party politicians
Living people
Singaporean people of Teochew descent
Singaporean Buddhists
Nanyang University alumni